The Abbottabad Hockey Stadium is a field hockey stadium in Abbottabad in the Khyber Pakhtunkhwa province of Pakistan. It is located at Circular Road in Abbottabad, and was built in 1988. No international matches have taken place there yet, but the stadium has hosted various national, divisional and local tournaments, as well as national team camps. 

It has an AstroTurf surface. Currently, proposals are being made for the development of the stadium including a pavilion, dressing rooms and stands for spectators.

References 

Abbottabad District
Buildings and structures in Abbottabad
Field hockey venues in Pakistan
Sports venues in Pakistan
Stadiums in Pakistan